"We Are All Prostitutes" is a song by English post-punk band The Pop Group. It was released as the band's second single on 9 November 1979 through Rough Trade Records. The song is a critique of consumerism.

The song was included as the third track in the 2016 reissue of The Pop Group's 1980 album For How Much Longer Do We Tolerate Mass Murder?

Reception 
Songwriter Nick Cave declared the song to be the band's masterpiece, saying, "It had everything that I thought rock and roll should have. It was violent, paranoid music for a violent, paranoid time." Writer Mark Fisher described the song "scouring, seesawing, seasick funk, a pied piper’s exit from dominant reality, fired by a fissile compound of millenarian terror and militant jubilation."

Legacy 

(*) designates unordered lists.

Formats and track listing 
All songs written by The Pop Group.

UK 7" single (RT 023)
 "We Are All Prostitutes" – 3:08
 "Amnesty International Report on British Army Torture of Irish Prisoners" – 3:08

Credits and personnel
The Pop Group
 Dan Catsis – bass guitar
 Gareth Sager – guitar, saxophone
 Bruce Smith – drums, percussion
 Mark Stewart – vocals
 John Waddington – guitar

Additional musicians
 Tristan Honsinger – cello (B-side)

Technical personnel
 Maxwell Anandappa – mastering
 Dennis Bovell – production
 Adam Kidron – engineering
 The Pop Group – production

Charts

References

External links 
 
 "We Are All Prostitutes" at Bandcamp

1979 songs
1979 singles
The Pop Group songs
Protest songs
Songs about consumerism
Songs against capitalism
Rough Trade Records singles
Songs written by Gareth Sager
Songs written by Bruce Smith (musician)
Songs written by Mark Stewart (English musician)